Drasteria flexuosa is a moth of the family Erebidae first described by Édouard Ménétries in 1847. It is found in the semi-deserts and deserts from eastern Egypt, to Israel, Jordan, Syria, Kazakhstan, China, Mongolia and Afghanistan.

There are two generations per year. Adults are on wing in from February to May and October to November.

The larvae feed on the leaves of Alhagi sparsifolia.

References

External links

Image

Drasteria
Moths of Africa
Moths of Asia
Moths described in 1847